Sociedade Esportiva Recreativa e Cultural Brasil, commonly referred to as Brasil de Farroupilha, is a Brazilian football club based in Farroupilha, Rio Grande do Sul. It currently plays in Campeonato Gaúcho Série A2, the second level of the Rio Grande do Sul state football league.

History
Sociedade Esportiva Recreativa e Cultural Brasil were founded on January 19, 1939. They won the Campeonato Gaúcho Second Level in 1992, after beating 14 de Julho in the final. Brasil de Farroupilha's Renato Teixeira, with 23 goals, was the league's top goalscorer.

Stadium
Brasil de Farroupilha play their home games at Estádio das Castanheiras. The stadium has a maximum capacity of 5,000 people.

Current squad (selected)

Achievements

 Campeonato Gaúcho Second Level:
 Winners (1): 1992

References

External links
 Official website

 
Association football clubs established in 1939
Football clubs in Rio Grande do Sul
1939 establishments in Brazil